Dihya ibn Khalifa al-Kalbi (Diḥya al-Kalbī), sometimes spelled Dahyah, was the envoy who delivered the Islamic prophet Muhammad's message to the Roman Emperor Heraclius.

According to Muhammad's wife Aisha, he saw Jibril twice “in the form that he was created” and on other occasions as a man resembling Dihya ibn Khalifa al-Kalbi, an extraordinarily handsome disciple of Muhammad.

Two similar narrations have been recorded through Abu Uthman in Sahih al-Bukhari that reports an incident witnessed by Muhammad's wife Umm Salama:

Expedition of Zaid ibn Harithah (Hisma)

He was attacked during the Expedition of Zayd ibn Harithah (Hisma) 
Dihya approached the Banu Dubayb (a tribe which converted to Islam and had good relations with Muslims) for help. When the news reached Muhammad, he immediately dispatched Zayd ibn Harithah with 500 men to punish them. The Muslim army fought with Banu Judham, killed several of them (inflicting heavy casualties), including their chief, Al-Hunayd ibn Arid and his son, and captured 1000 camels, 5000 of their cattle and a 100 women and boys. The chief of the Banu Judham who had embraced Islam appealed to Muhammad to release his fellow tribesmen, and Muhammad released them.

Death and descendants

Kalbi died in Mezzeh, Damascus and was buried there.

See also
List of battles of Muhammad

References 

Banu Kalb
Companions of the Prophet